The Asia/Oceania Zone was one of three zones of regional competition in the 2000 Fed Cup.

Group I
Venue: Utsubo Tennis Center, Osaka, Japan (outdoor hard)
Date: 25–30 April

The eleven teams were divided into one pool of six and one pool five teams. The teams that finished first in the pools played-off to determine which team would partake in the World Group Play-offs next year. The two nations coming last in the pools were relegated to Group II for 2001.

Pools

Play-off

  advanced to 2001 World Group Play-offs.
  and  relegated to Group II in 2001.

Group II
Venue: Utsubo Tennis Center, Osaka, Japan (outdoor hard)
Date: 25–30 April

The eleven teams were divided into two pools of six and five teams. The top two teams from each pool then moved on to the play-off stage of the competition. The two teams that won a match from the play-off stage would advance to Group I for 2001.

Pools

Play-offs

  and  Pacific Oceania advanced to Group I in 2001.

See also
Fed Cup structure

References

 Fed Cup Profile, Japan
 Fed Cup Profile, India
 Fed Cup Profile, Thailand
 Fed Cup Profile, Kazakhstan
 Fed Cup Profile, China
 Fed Cup Profile, Indonesia
 Fed Cup Profile, Chinese Taipei
 Fed Cup Profile, South Korea
 Fed Cup Profile, New Zealand
 Fed Cup Profile, Uzbekistan
 Fed Cup Profile, Pacific Oceania
 Fed Cup Profile, Malaysia
 Fed Cup Profile, Fiji
 Fed Cup Profile, Philippines
 Fed Cup Profile, Tajikistan
 Fed Cup Profile, Sri Lanka
 Fed Cup Profile, Jordan
 Fed Cup Profile, Pakistan

External links
 Fed Cup website

 
Asia Oceania
Sport in Osaka
Tennis tournaments in Japan